Jhulan Sinha  was an Indian politician, lawyer and social worker. He was a close compatriot of Dr Rajendra Prasad and was one of the leading freedom fighters from Bihar. Influenced by Mahatma Gandhi, he gave up his successful law practice to join the freedom struggle, work for the farmers and social causes. He was elected to the Lok Sabha, lower house of the Parliament of India  twice as a member of the Indian National Congress. He was also a member of the Bihar Legislative Assembly.

References

External links
Official Biographical Sketch in Lok Sabha Website

Lok Sabha members from Bihar
India MPs 1957–1962
India MPs 1952–1957
Indian National Congress politicians
1904 births
Year of death missing